Mackerel is a common name applied to a number of different species of pelagic fish, mostly from the family Scombridae. They are found in both temperate and tropical seas, mostly living along the coast or offshore in the oceanic environment.
 
Mackerel species typically have deeply forked tails and vertical 'tiger-like' stripes on their backs with an iridescent green-blue quality. Many are restricted in their distribution ranges and live in separate populations or fish stocks based on geography. Some stocks migrate in large schools along the coast to suitable spawning grounds, where they spawn in fairly shallow waters. After spawning they return the way they came in smaller schools to suitable feeding grounds, often near an area of upwelling. From there they may move offshore into deeper waters and spend the winter in relative inactivity. Other stocks migrate across oceans.

Smaller mackerel are forage fish for larger predators, including larger mackerel and Atlantic cod. Flocks of seabirds, whales, dolphins, sharks, and schools of larger fish such as tuna and marlin follow mackerel schools and attack them in sophisticated and cooperative ways. Mackerel flesh is high in omega-3 oils and is intensively harvested by humans. In 2009, over 5 million tons were landed by commercial fishermen. Sport fishermen value the fighting abilities of the king mackerel.


Species
Over 30 different species, principally belonging to the family Scombridae, are commonly referred to as mackerel. The term "mackerel" is derived from Old French and may have originally meant either "marked, spotted" or "pimp, procurer". The latter connection is not altogether clear, but mackerel spawn enthusiastically in shoals near the coast, and medieval ideas on animal procreation were creative.

Scombroid mackerels
About 21 species in the family Scombridae are commonly called mackerel. The type species for the scombroid mackerel is the Atlantic mackerel, Scomber scombrus. Until recently, Atlantic chub mackerel and Indo-Pacific chub mackerel were thought to be subspecies of the same species. In 1999, Collette established, on molecular and morphological considerations, that these are separate species. Mackerel are smaller with shorter lifecycles than their close relatives, the tuna, which are also members of the same family.

Scombrini, the true mackerels
The true mackerels belong to the tribe Scombrini. The tribe consists of seven species, each belonging to one of two genera: Scomber or Rastrelliger.

Scomberomorini, the Spanish mackerels
The Spanish mackerels belong to the tribe Scomberomorini, which is the "cousin tribe" of the true mackerels. This tribe consists of 21 species in all—18 of those are classified into the genus Scomberomorus, two into Grammatorcynus, and a single species into the monotypic genus Acanthocybium.

Other mackerel
In addition, a number of species with mackerel-like characteristics in the families Carangidae, Hexagrammidae and Gempylidae are commonly referred to as mackerel. Some confusion had occurred between the Pacific jack mackerel (Trachurus symmetricus) and the heavily harvested Chilean jack mackerel (T. murphyi). These have been thought at times to be the same species, but are now recognised as separate species.

The term "mackerel" is also used as a modifier in the common names of other fish, sometimes indicating the fish has vertical stripes similar to a scombroid mackerel:

 Mackerel icefish—Champsocephalus gunnari
 Mackerel pike—Cololabis saira
 Mackerel scad—Decapterus macarellus
 Mackerel shark—several species
 Shortfin mako shark—Isurus oxyrinchus
 Mackerel tuna—Euthynnus affinis
 Mackerel tail goldfish—Carassius auratus

By extension, the term is applied also to other species such as the mackerel tabby cat, and to inanimate objects such as the altocumulus mackerel sky cloud formation.

Characteristics

Most mackerel belong to the family Scombridae, which also includes tuna and bonito. Generally, mackerel are much smaller and slimmer than tuna, though in other respects, they share many common characteristics. Their scales, if present at all, are extremely small. Like tuna and bonito, mackerel are voracious feeders, and are swift and manoeuvrable swimmers, able to streamline themselves by retracting their fins into grooves on their bodies. Like other scombroids, their bodies are cylindrical with numerous finlets on the dorsal and ventral sides behind the dorsal and anal fins, but unlike the deep-bodied tuna, they are slim.

The type species for scombroid mackerels is the Atlantic mackerel, Scomber scombrus. These fish are iridescent blue-green above with a silvery underbelly and near-vertical wavy black stripes running along their upper bodies.

The prominent stripes on the back of mackerels seemingly are there to provide camouflage against broken backgrounds. That is not the case, though, because mackerel live in midwater pelagic environments which have no background. However, fish have an optokinetic reflex in their visual systems that can be sensitive to moving stripes. For fish to school efficiently, they need feedback mechanisms that help them align themselves with adjacent fish, and match their speed. The stripes on neighbouring fish provide "schooling marks", which signal changes in relative position.

A layer of thin, reflecting platelets is seen on some of the mackerel stripes. In 1998, E J Denton and D M Rowe argued that these platelets transmit additional information to other fish about how a given fish moves. As the orientation of the fish changes relative to another fish, the amount of light reflected to the second fish by this layer also changes. This sensitivity to orientation gives the mackerel "considerable advantages in being able to react quickly while schooling and feeding."

Mackerel range in size from small forage fish to larger game fish. Coastal mackerel tend to be small. The king mackerel is an example of a larger mackerel. Most fish are cold-blooded, but exceptions exist. Certain species of fish maintain elevated body temperatures. Endothermic bony fishes are all in the suborder Scombroidei and include the butterfly mackerel, a species of primitive mackerel.

Mackerel are strong swimmers. Known in the latin family as "punctualis piscis" which translates to "punctual fish." This is due to its punctuality of migration during mating season as it moves from warm to cold waters. Atlantic mackerel can swim at a sustained speed of 0.98 m/sec with a burst speed of 5.5 m/sec, while chub mackerel can swim at a sustained speed of 0.92 m/sec with a burst speed of 2.25 m/sec.

Distribution

Most mackerel species have restricted distribution ranges.

 Atlantic Spanish mackerel (Scomberomorus maculatus) occupy the waters off the east coast of North America from the Cape Cod area south to the Yucatan Peninsula. Its population is considered to include two fish stocks, defined by geography.  As summer approaches, one stock moves in large schools north from Florida up the coast to spawn in shallow waters off the New England coast. It then returns to winter in deeper waters off Florida. The other stock migrates in large schools along the coast from Mexico to spawn in shallow waters of the Gulf of Mexico off Texas. It then returns to winter in deeper waters off the Mexican coast. These stocks are managed separately, even though genetically they are identical.
 The Atlantic mackerel (Scomber scombrus) is a coastal species found only in the north Atlantic. The stock on the west side of the Atlantic is largely independent of the stock on the east side. The stock on the east Atlantic currently operates as three separate stocks, the southern, western and North Sea stocks, each with their own migration patterns. Some mixing of the east Atlantic stocks takes place in feeding grounds towards the north, but there is almost no mixing between the east and west Atlantic stocks.
 Another common coastal species, the chub mackerel (Scomber japonicus), is absent from the Atlantic Ocean but is widespread across both hemispheres in the Pacific, where its migration patterns are somewhat similar to those of Atlantic mackerel. In the northern hemisphere, chub mackerel migrate northwards in the summer to feeding grounds, and southwards in the winter when they spawn in relatively shallow waters. In the southern hemisphere the migrations are reversed. After spawning, some stocks migrate down the continental slope to deeper water and spend the rest of the winter in relative inactivity.
 The Chilean jack mackerel (Trachurus murphyi), the most intensively harvested mackerel-like species, is found in the south Pacific from West Australia to the coasts of Chile and Peru. A cousin species, the Pacific jack mackerel (Trachurus symmetricus), is found in the north Pacific. The Chilean jack mackerel occurs along the coasts in upwelling areas, but also migrates across the open ocean. Its abundance can fluctuate markedly as ocean conditions change, and is particularly affected by the El Niño.

Three species of jack mackerels are found in coastal waters around New Zealand: the Australasian, Chilean, and Pacific jack mackerels. They are mainly captured using purse seine nets, and are managed as a single stock that includes multiple species.

Some mackerel species migrate vertically. Adult snake mackerel conduct a diel vertical migration, staying in deeper water during the day and rising to the surface at night to feed. The young and juveniles also migrate vertically, but in the opposite direction, staying near the surface during the day and moving deeper at night. This species feeds on squid, pelagic crustaceans, lanternfishes, flying fishes, sauries, and other mackerel. It is, in turn, preyed upon by tuna and marlin.

Lifecycle

Mackerel are prolific broadcast spawners, and must breed near the surface of the water because the eggs of the females float. Individual females lay between 300,000 and 1,500,000 eggs. Their eggs and larvae are pelagic, that is, they float free in the open sea. The larvae and juvenile mackerel feed on zooplankton. As adults, they have sharp teeth, and hunt small crustaceans such as copepods, forage fish, shrimp, and squid. In turn, they are hunted by larger pelagic animals such as tuna, billfish, sea lions, sharks, and pelicans.

Off Madagascar, spinner sharks follow migrating schools of mackerel. Bryde's whales feed on mackerel when they can find them. They use several feeding methods, including skimming the surface, lunging, and bubble nets.

Fisheries

Chub mackerel, Scomber japonicus, are the most intensively fished scombroid mackerel. They account for about half the total capture production of scombroid mackerels. As a species, they are easily confused with Atlantic mackerel. Chub mackerel migrate long distances in oceans and across the Mediterranean. They can be caught with drift nets and suitable trawls, but are most usually caught with surround nets at night by attracting them with lampara lamps.

The remaining catch of scombroid mackerels is divided equally between the Atlantic mackerel and all other scombroid mackerels. 
Just these two species (Chub mackerel and Atlantic mackerel) account for about 75% of the total catch of scombroid mackerels.

Chilean jack mackerel are the most commonly fished nonscombroid mackerel, fished as heavily as chub mackerel. The species has been overfished, and its fishery may now be in danger of collapsing.

Smaller mackerel behave like herrings, and are captured in similar ways. Fish species like these, which school near the surface, can be caught efficiently by purse seining. Huge purse-seine vessels use spotter planes to locate the schooling fish. Then they close in using sophisticated sonar to track the shape of the school, which is then encircled with fast auxiliary boats that deploy purse seines as they speed around the school.

Suitably designed trollers can also catch mackerels effectively when they swim near the surface. Trollers typically have several long booms which they lift and drop with "topping lifts". They haul their lines with electric or hydraulic reels. Fish aggregating devices are also used to target mackerel.

Management
The North Sea has been overfished to the point where the ecological balance has become disrupted and many jobs in the fishing industry have been lost.

The Southeast US region spans the Gulf of Mexico, the Caribbean Sea, and the US Southeast Atlantic. Overfishing of king and Spanish mackerel occurred in the 1980s. Regulations were introduced to restrict the size, fishing locations, and bag limits for recreational fishers and commercial fishers. Gillnets were banned in waters off Florida. By 2001, the mackerel stocks had bounced back.

As food

Mackerel is an important food fish that is consumed worldwide. As an oily fish, it is a rich source of omega-3 fatty acids. The flesh of mackerel spoils quickly, especially in the tropics, and can cause scombroid food poisoning. Accordingly, it should be eaten on the day of capture, unless properly refrigerated or cured.

Mackerel preservation is not simple. Before the 19th-century development of canning and the widespread availability of refrigeration, salting and smoking were the principal preservation methods available. Historically in England, this fish was not preserved, but was consumed only in its fresh form. However, spoilage was common, leading the authors of The Cambridge Economic History of Europe to remark: "There are more references to stinking mackerel in English literature than to any other fish!" In France, mackerel was traditionally pickled with large amounts of salt, which allowed it to be sold widely across the country.

For many years mackerel was regarded as 'unclean' in the UK and other places due to folklore which suggested that the fish fed on the corpses of dead sailors. A 1976 survey of housewives in Britain undertaken by the White Fish Authority indicated a reluctance to departing from buying the traditional staples of cod, haddock or salmon. Less than 10% of the survey's 1,931 respondents had ever bought mackerel and only 3% did so regularly. As a result of this trend many UK fishmongers during the 1970s did not display or even stock mackerel.

References

Further reading 

 
 
 Bigelow HB and Schroeder WC (1953) Fishes of the Gulf of Maine: Mackerel Fisheries Bulletin, Volume 53, Number 74, United States Fish and Wildlife Service.
 Burton M and Burton R (2002) International Wildlife Encyclopedia Marshall Cavendish, pp. 1517–1518. .
 
 Keay JN (2001) Handling and processing mackerel Torry advisory note 66.
 
 
 
 
 SPRFMO(2009) Information describing Chilean jack mackerel (Trachurus murphyi) fisheries relating to the South Pacific Regional Fishery Management Organisation  Working draft.

External links

 Atlantic Mackerel British Marine Life Study Society. Retrieved 3 March 2012.
 Mackerel nutrition facts
 Fishing for mackerel
 

Scombridae
 
Oily fish
Commercial fish
Fish common names